Gabrielle Drake (born 30 March 1944) is a British actress. She appeared in the 1970s in television series The Brothers and UFO. In the early 1970s she appeared in several erotic roles on screen. She later took parts in soap operas Crossroads and Coronation Street. She has also had a stage career.

Her brother was the musician Nick Drake, whose work she has consistently helped to promote since his death in 1974.

Early life and education
Drake was born in Lahore, British India, the daughter of Rodney Drake and amateur songwriter Molly Drake. Her father was an engineer working for the Bombay Burmah Trading Corporation. The family moved from Burma to Britain when she was eight. 

She later commented that, 

On the ship travelling to Britain she appeared in children's theatrical productions, later saying of herself "I was a dreadful exhibitionist." She attended Edgbaston College for Girls in Birmingham, Wycombe Abbey School, Buckinghamshire and the Royal Academy of Dramatic Art (RADA) in London. She has had a long stage career beginning in the mid-1960s, and has regularly appeared in television dramas.

Screen career
Drake first gained wide attention for her portrayal of Lieutenant Gay Ellis in the 1970 science fiction television series UFO, in which her costume consisted of a silver suit and a purple wig. In the series, the character is the commander of the SHADO Moonbase, which is Earth's first line of defence against invading flying saucers. Drake appeared in roughly half the 26 episodes produced, leaving the series during a break in the production to pursue other acting opportunities.

In 1971, Drake appeared in a short film entitled Crash!, based on a chapter in J. G. Ballard's book The Atrocity Exhibition. The film, directed by Harley Cokeliss, featured Ballard talking about the ideas in his book. Drake appeared as a passenger and car-crash victim. Ballard later developed the idea into his 1973 novel Crash. In his draft of the novel he mentioned Drake by name, but references to her were removed from the published version. In the 2009 BBC documentary Synth Britannia clips of Ballard and Drake from Crash! were inserted into the 1979 video for Gary Numan's song "Cars". A reviewer in The Scotsman commented that the presence of Drake "brought serious glamour to urban alienation".

In the early 1970s, Drake was associated with the boom in British sexploitation movies, repeatedly appearing nude or topless. She played a nude artist's model in the 1970 film Connecting Rooms, and was one of Peter Sellers' conquests in the film There's a Girl in My Soup. She also played one of the lead roles in the sex comedy Au Pair Girls (1972) and appeared in two Derek Ford films, Suburban Wives (1971) and its sequel Commuter Husbands (1972), in which she played the narrator who links the disparate episodes together.

Her early television appearances include The Avengers (1967), Coronation Street (as Inga Olsen in 1967) and The Saint (1968). In 1970, she auditioned for the part of Jo Grant in Doctor Who, reaching the final shortlist of three, but did not get the part.
On December 26, 1968 she played opposite American actor Robert Lansing in a BBC television series called Journey to the Unknown in an episode called "The Beckoning Fair One", and an episode called "Sorry Is Just a Word" of Special Branch.

She gained wide exposure in The Brothers, the hit BBC family drama series, in which she appeared as a regular for the first four seasons playing Jill, the girlfriend (and later wife) of David Hammond. She also appeared in an episode of Brian Clemens' 1970s series Thriller, in The Kelly Monteith Show (as Monteith's wife 1979–80), a television version of The Importance of Being Earnest (1985, for LWT/PBS), Crossroads (1985–87, as motel boss Nicola Freeman) and returned to Coronation Street in 2009 as Vanessa. In The Inspector Lynley Mysteries (2003–05) she played the protagonist's mother.

She was the subject of This Is Your Life on 8 April 1987.

Stage career
Drake made her stage debut in 1964, during the inaugural season of the Everyman Theatre, Liverpool, playing Cecily in The Importance of Being Earnest. In 1966, she joined the Birmingham Repertory Company and played Queen Isabella in Marlowe's Edward II. She also had roles in Private Lives (with Renee Asherson), The Simpleton of the Unexpected Isles (with Linda Marlowe and Patrick Mower), Twelfth Night and Inadmissible Evidence. The following year, she was Roxanne in Cyrano de Bergerac at the Open Air Theatre, Regent's Park. In the 1974–5, season at the Bristol Old Vic, she played in Cowardy Custard, a devised entertainment featuring the words and music of Noël Coward. In 1975, she appeared as Madeline Bassett in the original London cast of the Andrew Lloyd Webber and Alan Ayckbourn musical Jeeves. She also appeared in French Without Tears at the Little Theatre, Bristol. In 1978, she played Lavinia, opposite Simon Callow in the title role, in Shakespeare's Titus Andronicus, directed by Adrian Noble, at the New Vic, Bristol. She also appeared at the Bristol Old Vic in that year, in Vanbrugh's The Provok'd Wife.

She was directed by Mike Ockrent in Look, No Hans!, alongside David Jason, during the 83–84 season at the Theatre Royal, Bath. She made a second appearance in The Importance of Being Earnest at the Royalty Theatre, London, in a production directed by Donald Sinden, which also starred Wendy Hiller, Clive Francis, Phyllida Law and Denis Lawson (87-88). In 1988, she played Fiona Foster in a revival of Ayckbourn's How the Other Half Loves, first at the Greenwich Theatre, then at the Duke of York's Theatre. During the 1990–91 season at the Theatre Royal, Bath, she played in Risky Kisses with Ian Lavender. She was in the Mobil Touring Theatre's official centenary production of Charley's Aunt in 1991, with Frank Windsor, Patrick Cargill and Mark Curry. In 1993, she was Monica in Coward's Present Laughter at the Globe Theatre, London, in a revival directed by and starring Tom Conti. She co-starred with Jeremy Clyde in the 1995 King's Head Theatre tour of Cavalcade, directed by Dan Crawford. In 1999, she was Vittoria in Paul Kerryson's production of The White Devil at the Haymarket Theatre, Leicester. She also toured with the Oxford Stage Company in that year, as Hester Bellboys in John Whiting's A Penny for a Song, alongside Julian Glover, Jeremy Clyde, and Charles Kay. She played Mrs Malaprop in the 2002 touring production of The Rivals with the British Actors' Theatre Company, whose artistic director, Kate O'Mara, was Drake's co-star in the TV series The Brothers.

She has made regular appearances at the Royal Exchange Theatre, Manchester, since her debut there in a non-pantomime version of Cinderella, written by Trevor Peacock, in 1979. That same year, she co-starred with Sorcha Cusack and Susan Penhaligon in Caspar Wrede's production of The Cherry Orchard. In 1986, she was Madame Gobette in the British premiere of Maurice Hennequin's Court in the Act, which subsequently played at the Yvonne Arnaud Theatre, Guildford, and the Theatre Royal, Bath, before transferring to the Phoenix Theatre in London (1987). Other roles at the Royal Exchange include Mrs Erlynne in Lady Windermere's Fan (1996); Anna in The Ghost Train Tattoo (2000); Fay in Loot (2001); Lady Bracknell in The Importance of Being Earnest (2004); and The Comtesse de la Briere in What Every Woman Knows (2006). At the same theatre in 2001, Drake replaced Patricia Routledge as Mrs Conway during the rehearsal period for J. B. Priestley's Time and the Conways, when Routledge was forced to withdraw from the production due to illness.
 
Elsewhere, she has appeared in her one-woman show, Dear Scheherazade, as the 19th century writer Elizabeth Gaskell (2005, 2007, 2010).  At the Chipping Campden Literature Festival in 2011, she and Martin Jarvis read extracts from the letters and diaries of Robert and Clara Schumann in the recital, Beloved Clara. She had appeared in the same piece the previous year, again with Jarvis and the pianist Lucy Parham, at the Wigmore Hall in London.

Personal life

Drake has helped to ensure the public renown of her brother Nick Drake and her mother Molly Drake.  She can be heard accompanying her brother Nick on a number of songs that he recorded privately, and which have since been released on the album Family Tree. After the release of songs written and performed by her mother, she said "Her creativity was a personal thing, and she was lucky to be able to develop it in an environment where that side of her was totally accepted. Indeed, my father encouraged it. He was so proud of her. On one occasion, he even made the 20-mile drive to Birmingham to get four songs pressed onto a disc." In 2014, she co-wrote and edited, with Cally Callomon,  Nick Drake: Remembered for a While, a memoir of her brother. In April 2018, she collected the Hall of Fame Folk Award 2018 on her brother's behalf in Belfast.

She lives in Wenlock Abbey in Much Wenlock, Shropshire, in a house she bought in 1983 with her husband, South African-born artist Louis de Wet, who died in 2018.  They renovated their home over several years as an artistic project and, in 2004, he described it as "the most beautiful building site in the world". Drake was the co-producer, with Cally Callomon, of In the Gaze of the Medusa, a 2013 film by Gavin Bush about the renovation project and her husband's designs for the house.

Selected filmography
 The Man Outside (1967)
 Crossplot (1969)
 Connecting Rooms (1970)
 There's a Girl in My Soup (1970)
 Suburban Wives (1971)
 Commuter Husbands (1972)
 Au Pair Girls (1972)
 All About a Prima Ballerina (1980)
 The Steal (1995)

Television roles
 Riviera Police (one episode, 1965)
 The Avengers (one episode, "The Hidden Tiger" as Angora, produced in January 1967)
 The Saint (one episode, "The Best Laid Schemes", 1968)
 Journey to the Unknown (one episode, "The Beckoning Fair One", 26 December 1968)
 The Champions (one episode, "Full Circle",1969)
 UFO (1969–70)
 Special Branch (one episode, "Sorry Is Just a Word", 1970)
 Man at the Top (one episode, "Join the Human Race", 1970)
 The Brothers (1972–74)
 Thriller (one episode, "Kill Two Birds", 1976)
 The New Avengers (one episode, "Dead Men Are Dangerous", 1977)
 The Professionals (1978)
 The Kelly Monteith Show (1979–80)
 Never the Twain (1981)
 Number 10 (one episode, 1983)
 Crossroads (1985–87)
 The Inspector Lynley Mysteries (2003–05)
 Doctors (2011)

Audio recordings
 The Songs and Poems of Molly Drake (2017)

References

Bibliography

External links

1944 births
20th-century British actresses
21st-century British actresses
Actresses from Lahore
Alumni of RADA
British film actresses
British Shakespearean actresses
British stage actresses
British television actresses
Living people
People educated at Wycombe Abbey
People from Much Wenlock
People from Lahore